The 1905–06 Manitoba Hockey Association (MHA) season  was won by the Kenora Thistles, successfully defending their championship.

Regular season

Final standing

 A tie between Brandon and the Winnipeg Hockey Club was replayed. Winnipeg won the replay to tie Kenora for the league lead.
Source: Zweig, 2012.

Playoff

Kenora defeated Winnipeg to take the league title. Kenora challenged for the Stanley Cup, however the challenge was not played until the following season.

See also
 List of Stanley Cup champions

References

 

Manitoba Hockey Association seasons
Man